Amanda Louise Wyss (born November 24, 1960) is an American actress. She began her career in the early 1980s in teen-oriented roles such as Lisa in the coming-of-age comedy film Fast Times at Ridgemont High (1982), Tina Gray in the slasher film A Nightmare on Elm Street (1984), and Beth in the black comedy film Better Off Dead (1985). Additionally, she had a supporting role as investigative reporter Randi McFarland in the television series Highlander: The Series (1992–1993). She is also known for playing Woody's ex-girlfriend, Beth, in two episodes of Cheers in the mid-1980s.

Career
Wyss was born in Manhattan Beach, California. She was discovered by an agent who saw her portray Flora in The Innocents, and Rhoda in The Bad Seed at local LA theatres. After appearing in commercials, Wyss landed her first television role, recurring on Universal's When the Whistle Blows (1980) as Dolph Sweet's daughter. The same year, she guest-starred on the television series The Righteous Apples. In 1981, Wyss starred in the films This House Possessed and Force: Five, and guest-starred on episodes of the several television series, including Buck Rogers in the 25th Century, ABC Afterschool Specials, Jessica Novak, and Teachers Only.

In 1982, Wyss had a supporting role as high-school student Lisa in Amy Heckerling's teen comedy classic Fast Times at Ridgemont High, written by Cameron Crowe and featuring then-unknown actors Sean Penn, Phoebe Cates, Forest Whitaker, Jennifer Jason Leigh, and Nicolas Cage. Wyss was called in specifically to audition for the character of Lisa and had to improvise with Judge Reinhold.

The same year, she guest-starred on two episodes of the television series Star of the Family. In 1983, Wyss appeared in the television films Lone Star, The Tom Swift and Linda Craig Mystery Hour, and A Killer in the Family.

The following year, Wyss starred in the television film My Mother's Secret Life before starring in Wes Craven's horror film A Nightmare on Elm Street (1984) as Tina Gray (the first person murdered onscreen by Freddy Krueger), along with Robert Englund, Heather Langenkamp, John Saxon, and Johnny Depp. Like all of the other actresses auditioning for the film, she originally read for the part of Nancy Thompson. After receiving a callback, she was paired with Langenkamp and auditioned for the supporting role of Tina, which ultimately went to her.

The following year, Wyss guest-starred in the television series Otherworld before starring in the films Silverado as Phoebe and Better Off Dead as Beth, who sunk the main character into his depression by breaking up with him. From 1985 to 1986, Wyss guest-starred on St. Elsewhere as Pru Dowler and Cheers as Beth Curtis. In 1986, Wyss starred in the television films Firefighter and Something in Common. The same year, she starred in Flag. In 1987, Wyss was cast in the television film Independence and the television series The New Adventures of Beans Baxter, My Two Dads, and Cagney & Lacey. In 1989, Wyss starred in the horror film To Die For as Celia Kett. The same year, she portrayed Rabbit Layton in Powwow Highway.

In 1990, Wyss appeared in the cult horror film, Shakma (1990). In 1991, Wyss reprised her role as Celia in Son of Darkness: To Die For II and starred alongside Mark Hamill in Black Magic Woman. The following year, Wyss starred in season one of the fantasy television series Highlander: The Series (1992) as a reporter named Randi McFarland. In 1997, Wyss was cast as Michelle Harding in Strategic Command. In 1999, Wyss guest-starred as Stevie on the television series Charmed. The following year, Wyss was cast in the short film Bella! Bella! Bella! as Charlotte Breceda. In 2001, Wyss guest-starred on the crime series CSI: Crime Scene Investigation. In 2002, she appeared in an episode each of Judging Amy and Drew Carey Show. In 2004, Wyss portrayed Sonya Witkowski in an episode of the television series Cold Case. In 2006, Wyss guest-starred as a social worker in the television series Dexter.

She was a special guest of the Crypticon 2010. The same year, Wyss appeared in The Graves (2010). In 2014, Wyss portrayed Joanna Cass in an episode of Major Crimes. In 2016, Amanda starred in the horror film The Id. The same year, Wyss had a recurring role as Kat Cooper in three episodes of the television series Murder in the First.

Filmography

Film

Television

References

External links

 

1960 births
Actresses from California
American film actresses
American television actresses
Living people
People from Manhattan Beach, California
Actors from Manhattan Beach, California
21st-century American women